A listing of the Pulitzer Prize award winners for 1998:

Journalism

Letters

 Biography or Autobiography
 Personal History by Katharine Graham (Alfred A. Knopf) 
 Fiction
 American Pastoral by Philip Roth (Houghton Mifflin)
 History
 Summer for the Gods: The Scopes Trial and America's Continuing Debate Over Science and Religion by Edward Larson (BasicBooks) 
 General Non-Fiction
 Guns, Germs and Steel: The Fates of Human Societies by Jared Diamond (W.W. Norton) 
 Poetry
 Black Zodiac by Charles Wright (Farrar) 
 Drama
 How I Learned to Drive by Paula Vogel (TCG)
 Music
 String Quartet No. 2 (musica instrumentalis) by Aaron Jay Kernis (Associated Music Publishers)
Premiered on January 19, 1990, at Merkin Concert Hall, New York City, by The Lark Quartet.

Special Awards and Citations

 Special Citation
 George Gershwin - Awarded posthumously to George Gershwin, commemorating the centennial year of his birth, for his distinguished and enduring contributions to American music.

References

External links
 

Pulitzer Prize
Pulitzer Prize
Pulitzer Prizes by year
Pulitzer Prize, 1998